Bommer is a surname. Notable people with the surname include:

Alois and Anna Bommer, German couple who faced a military tribunal at Metz along with their three daughters after World War II
Elisa Caroline Bommer (1832–1910), Belgian botanist specialising in mycology
Rudolf Bommer (born 1957), former German footballer and football manager
Nadine Bommer (born 1968), American-Israeli contemporary dance choreographer, teacher, and artistic director

See also
Bommer Weiher, lake near Alterswilen in the municipality of Kemmental, Canton of Thurgau, Switzerland